Eckhard J. Schnabel (born May 9, 1955 in Bad Cannstatt) is a German evangelical theologian and professor of the New Testament. He is the author of numerous scholarly books, Bible commentaries, specialist articles and lexical contributions.

Biography
After graduating from the Friedrich-Schiller Gymnasium Marbach in Marbach am Neckar, Germany,  Schnabel studied from 1974 at the State Independent Theological University of Basel in Basel, Switzerland.  In 1979 he produced his work on the Holy Scripture and its emergence as a problem of the Protestant Church: An investigation on the understanding of writing and inspiration of Protestant theology and church .  Schnabel graduated as Master of Theology . In 1983 he received his doctorate in law from the University of Aberdeen with his PhD in Law and Wisdom from Ben Sira to Paul: A Tradition Historical Inquiry Into the Relation of Law, Wisdom, and Ethics.

Between 1985 and 1988, Schnabel was a New Testament Lecturer, first at the Asian Theological Seminary in Quezon City, Philippines and, in 1987/1988, as study director for Biblical Studies at the Asia Graduate School of Theology in Manila . As a lecturer for New Testament he was from 1988 to 1998 at the (present) Giessen School of Theology, between 1989 and 1998 at the (present) Biblisch-Theological Academy Wiedenest in Bergneustadt. From 1998 to 2012 he was a New Testament professor at the Trinity Evangelical Divinity School (TEDS) near Chicago and since 2012 at the Gordon-Conwell Theological Seminary in South Hamilton, Massachusetts (USA).

Since 1981 Schnabel has been teaching at the Kraków Bible Institute, Poland, and since 1983 at the Evangelical Theological Faculty in Leuven, Belgium. Since 2006 he has been teaching at the Providence University College and Theological Seminary, Otterburne, Manitoba and since 2007 at the Colombo Theological Seminary, Colombo, Sri Lanka. Since 2010, he has been conducting pastoral courses at Timothy Training International, Hong Kong, China.

Schnabel is a member of the New Testament Society, the Tyndale Fellowship Evangelical Theological Society, Institute for Biblical Research, the Society of Biblical Literature, and Deputy Editor-in-Chief of the Bulletin for Biblical Research . Between 1991 and 1998 he served on the board of the Evangelical Theology Working Group, the Fellowship of European Evangelical Theologians between 1994 and 1998, the Society for New Testament Studies since 1988, the Tyndale Fellowship since 1990, and the Evangelical Theological Society since 1998, Institute of Biblical Research and Society of Biblical Literature .

He was involved in missionary operations with Operation Mobilization in Latin America and Europe between 1979 and 1981, and with Missionary with Overseas Missionary Fellowship from 1984 to 1988 in Manila, Philippines.

Between 1981 and 1983 he worked in charge at the Park Baptist Church, Aberdeen, Scotland, between 1998 and 2007 at the Village Church of Gurnee, and since 2012 at the First Congregational Church of Hamilton, Massachusetts. He has lectured since 1998 in various locations such as the Arlington Heights Evangelical Free Church and the Barrington Evangelical Free Church.

In addition to German and English, he is fluent in six ancient languages and four other languages that he uses for research purposes.

Degrees
1974 - Abitur (Friedrich-Schiller-Gymnasium)
1979 - Lic. Theol (Th.M) (Staatsunabhängige Theologische Hochschule Basel)
1983 - Ph.D. (University of Aberdeen)

Awards
Schnabel was awarded the 2003 Johann Tobias Beck Prize for Early Christian Mission, a 1,800-page book that, according to the convicting body, represents a significant contribution to theology from an evangelical perspective. As a comprehensive compendium of New Testament history and theology, it would probably become the standard work on the subject of "Mission in the New Testament" for years, according to its laudator Heinz-Werner Neudorfer .

Personal
Eckhard J. Schnabel is married to Barbara. The couple have two children.

Books
 
  
 
 
  
  
  
 
 
 
 
 
 
 
 

as co-author 
 with Heinz-Werner Neudorfer : The Study of the New Testament, Vol. 1, An Introduction to the Methods of Exegesis, SCM R. Brockhaus, Witten 1999,  . 
 with Heinz-Werner Neudorfer: The Study of the New Testament, Vol. 2, Special Problems, Exegetical and hermeneutic basic questions, SCM R. Brockhaus, Witten 2000,  . 
 with Stanley E. Porter: On the Writing of New Testament Commentaries, Brill 2012,  . 
 with David W. Chapman: The trial and crucifixion of Jesus: texts and commentary, Mohr Siebeck, Tübingen 2015,  .

Articles

Chapters

External links

References

1955 births
20th-century German Protestant theologians
21st-century German Protestant theologians
German biblical scholars
Living people
New Testament scholars